Rita McBride (born 1960) is an American artist and sculptor. She is based in Los Angeles and Düsseldorf. Alongside her artistic practice, McBride is a professor at the Kunstakademie Düsseldorf, and served as its director until 2017.  McBride is married to Glen Rubsamen, an American painter from Los Angeles.

Working at the intersection of architecture, design, and public space, McBride is known for her large scale works and installations, with her wider oeuvre incorporating performance, texts, and smaller scale sculptural work.

Life 
Rita McBride was born in Des Moines, Iowa in 1960. She received her BA from Bard College in New York in 1982 and her MFA from California Institute of the Arts in 1987, where she studied with Michael Asher and John Baldessari. After receiving her MFA, McBride began to exhibit her work widely initially with art galleries in Porto and Los Angeles. Her work has been the subject of more than seventy one-person exhibitions and twenty monographs.

Work and commissions 
McBride’s practice is concerned not only with sculptural or architectural form, but likewise the situations and happenings which arise in the audience’s relation to the works. Her most exhibited work, Arena (1997), for instance, is a modular structure which is assembled into a concave, arena-like seating area. First shown at the Witte de With in Rotterdam, Arena is activated by a calendar of programming curated by McBride and the host institution which range from lectures and artist talks to performance pieces by guest artists. McBride is the editor and co-author of a series of collaborative novels entitled Ways, each of which engage with a particular literary subgenre.

Major public commissions include Particulates, Dia Art Foundation, New York; Obelisk of Tutankhamum, Cologne, Germany (2017); Donkey’s Way, Moenchengladbach (2016); Artifacts (C.W.D), P.S. 315, Queens, New York (2015); Bells and Whistles, The New School, New York, (2014).

Mae West (2011), one of McBride's most known public works, is a 52-meter tall carbon structure in Munich. Built for the Effnerplatz, a hub for public and private transit in eastern Munich, it remarkably includes access for a tram line to run through its latticed base. Mae West caused a number of debates within the city. The sculpture and its reception by the residents of the area is the subject of Day After Day, a film by Alexander Hick.

Selected exhibitions

Selected solo exhibitions 
 2017-18: Particulates, Dia:Chelsea, New York
 2017: Rita McBride: Explorer, Wiels, Brussels
 2015-16: gesellschaft, kestnergesellschaft/Kunsthalle Düsseldorf
 2014: Public Tilt, Museum of Contemporary Art San Diego
 2013-14: Public Transaction, Museo Tamayo, Mexico City
 2012: Public Tender, Museu d'Art Contemporani de Barcelona (MACBA), Spain
 2010: Previously, Kunstmuseum Winterthur, Switzerland
 2008: Public Works, Museum Abteiberg, Mönchengladbach, Germany
2008: Some Settlements, Konrad Fischer Galerie, Düsseldorf
2007: Rita McBride, Galleria Alfonso Artiaco, Naples
 2004: Exhibition, SculptureCenter, Long Island City, New York
 2002: Naked Came the Stranger, Kunstmuseum Liechtenstein, Vaduz
 2000: Her House with the Upstairs in It, Deutscher Akademischer Austauschdienst Galerie (DAAD), Berlin
 1999: Aloof and Incidental, Annemarie Verna Galerie and Mai 36 Galerie, Zürich
 1997: The Donkey’s Way and Piggybackback (in collaboration with Catherine Opie and Lawrence Weiner), Galeria Pedro Oliveira, Porto
 1997: Hyperinclusion, OSMOS, Berlin
 1997: Rita McBride, Alexander and Bonin, New York
 1997: Arena & National Chain, Witte de With, Rotterdam
 1994: Backsliding, sideslipping, one Great Leap and the “forbidden”, Michael Klein Gallery, New York
 1990: Rita McBride New Work, Margo Leavin Gallery, Los Angeles
 1989: Rita McBride, Galeria Atlântica. Porto

Selected group exhibitions 
 2017-18: Studio for Propositional Cinema | in relationship to a Spectator, kestenergesellschaft, Hannover
 2016: EVERYTHING ARCHITECTURE, BOZAR, Centre for Fine Arts, Brussels
 2016: Liverpool Biennial 2016
 2011: Making Is Thinking, Witte de With, Rotterdam
 2007: The World as a Stage, Tate Modern, London and Institute of Contemporary Art, Boston
 2003: Living Inside the Grid, New Museum, New York
 2002: Taipei Biennial 2002: Great Theatre of the World, Taipei Fine Art Museum
 2000: What If: Art on the Verge of Architecture and Design, Moderna Museet, Stockholm
 1998: Where: Allegories of Site in Contemporary Art, Whitney Museum of American Art at Champion, Stamford, CT
 1994: Breakdown, Museum of Contemporary Art, San Diego
 1991: There's no There, There, Indianapolis Museum of Art

Collections 

 Ellipse Foundation, Alcoitão/Cascais
 Museu d’Art Contemporani de Barcelona
 Bundeskunstsammlung Zeitgenössischer Kunst, Bonn
 The Art Institute of Chicago
 Museum Ludwig, Cologne
 Des Moines Art Center, Iowa
 FRAC Bourgogne, Dijon
 Kunstsammlung Nordrhein-Westfalen, Düsseldorf
 Niedersächsische Sparkassenstiftung, Hannover
 San Diego Museum of Contemporary Art, La Jolla, California
 Hammer Museum, Los Angeles
 Los Angeles County Museum of Art, Los Angeles
 Museum of Contemporary Art, Los Angeles
 De Vleeshal, Middelburg, Netherlands
 Museum Abteiberg, Mönchengladbach
 New York Public Library
 Queens Museum of Art, New York
 Whitney Museum of American Art, New York
 Neues Museum, Nuremberg
 FRAC Île-de-France, Paris
 Museu de Serralves, Porto
 Witte de With Center for Contemporary Art, Rotterdam
 The Achenbach Foundation, San Francisco
 De Young Museum, San Francisco
 Legion of Honor, San Francisco
 Kunstmuseum St. Gallen
 De Pont Foundation for Contemporary Art, Tilburg
 Kunstmuseum Liechtenstein, Vaduz
 Institut d’Art Contemporain, Villeurbanne
 Wake Forest University Collection, Winston-Salem, North Carolina
 Kunstmuseum Winterthur
 Kunsthaus Zürich

Bibliography 
 Rita McBride: Public Works, 1988 – 2015. Texts by Gina Ashcraft, Gregor Jansen, Mark von Schlegell, Susanne Titz, and Christina Végh. Hannover, Kestner Gesellschaft; Kunsthalle Düsseldorf; Cologne; Verlag der Buchhandlung Walther König, 2016 
 Fernández-Galiano, Luis, Mark Wigley, Bartomeu Marí and Anne Pöhlmann. Rita McBride. Oferta pública / Public Tender. Barcelona: Museu d’Art Contemporani de Barcelona (MACBA), 2012 
 Schwarz, Dieter, Daniel Kurjakovic, and Iris Wien. Previously. Winterthur: Kunstmuseum Winterthur, 2010
 McBride, Rita. Explorer. London: Occasional Papers, 2018

References

External links 
 Official Website
 McBride at Alexander and Bonin

1960 births
Living people
Artists from Des Moines, Iowa
American women sculptors
Sculptors from Iowa
21st-century American women artists
21st-century American sculptors
20th-century American women artists
20th-century American sculptors
Academic staff of Kunstakademie Düsseldorf
American women academics